Mirjana Lučić was the defending champion and won in the final 6–2, 6–4 against Corina Morariu.

Seeds
A champion seed is indicated in bold text while text in italics indicates the round in which that seed was eliminated.

  Joannette Kruger (semifinals)
  Mary Joe Fernández (second round)
  Fang Li (first round)
  Mirjana Lučić (champion)
  Corina Morariu (final)
  Gala León García (first round)
  María Sánchez Lorenzo (first round)
  Sandra Kleinová (second round)

Draw

External links
 1998 Croatian Bol Ladies Open Draw

Croatian Bol Ladies Open
1998 WTA Tour